Little Deviants, known in Japan as , is a minigame compilation, developed by Bigbig Studios for the PlayStation Vita. The game was released on 17 December 2011 in Japan, 15 February 2012 in North America, 22 February 2012 in Europe, and 23 February 2012 in Australia as a launch title for the PlayStation Vita. Little Deviants is composed of 30 minigames that make use of the Vita's front multitouch touchscreen, rear multitouch touchpad, Sixaxis motion controls, and augmented reality capabilities, along with traditional controls. Little Deviants is Bigbig's last game since Sony Computer Entertainment announced the studio's closure on 10 January 2012.

Gameplay 
The goal of Little Deviants is to play through the game's 30 minigames in order to rebuild the Little Deviants' spaceship, which was destroyed by the Botz.

The game's minigames take advantage of the PlayStation Vita's front touchscreen, rear touchpad, SIXAXIS motion controls, rear camera, and augmented reality capabilities.

Reception
	

Little Deviants received "mixed" reviews according to the review aggregation website Metacritic. IGN said, "It's a decent piece of (admittedly overpriced) software. And its pretty, vivid graphics and surprisingly catchy old-school inspired soundtrack certainly please aesthetically. But a strong hook doesn't exist." Edge gave it five out of ten, saying, "Little Deviants real problem is simple: it's not moreish, and its challenges fail to reveal the kinds of nuance on the second and third tries that will have you refining strategies and aiming to better scores. Without that incentive to return, you're unlikely to." EGMNow gave it four out of ten, saying, "What should've been a fun collection of minigames showing off the Vita's capabilities ended up a completely unappealing tech demo. There isn't enough game here to justify the price."

References

External links
 Little Deviants at PlayStation.com
 

2011 video games
Minigame compilations
Multiplayer and single-player video games
PlayStation Vita games
PlayStation Vita-only games
Sony Interactive Entertainment games
Video games about extraterrestrial life
Video games developed in the United Kingdom